Cooper is an unincorporated community in Tazewell County, Illinois, United States. Cooper is notably home to a Roanoke Farmers' Co-op grain elevator.

References

Unincorporated communities in Tazewell County, Illinois
Unincorporated communities in Illinois